Maikammer is a Verbandsgemeinde ("collective municipality") in the Südliche Weinstraße district, in Rhineland-Palatinate, Germany. The seat of the municipality is in Maikammer. On 1 July 2014 it merged into the Verbandsgemeinde Edenkoben, but this merger was reverted by the constitutional court of Rhineland-Palatinate in June 2015.

The Verbandsgemeinde Maikammer consists of the following Ortsgemeinden ("local municipalities"):

 Kirrweiler 
 Maikammer
 Sankt Martin

References

Verbandsgemeinde in Rhineland-Palatinate
Südliche Weinstraße